

 is a photographer who has done advertising, portrait, architectural, and other work.

Jumonji was born in Yokohama on 4 March 1947. After studying at the Tokyo College of Photography he worked as an assistant to Kishin Shinoyama and went freelance in 1971, when he was the cameraman for advertisements for Matsushita Electric and Shiseido products.

The association with Matsushita would later bring awards from the Art Directors Club every year from 1975 till 1979. Jumonji has continued to do editorial and commercial work (notably for Hayashibara Biochemical Laboratories); while much of this owes a lot to its art direction as well as photography, Jumonji's advertising work has been uncommonly ambitious and witty.

In 1972 he joined an exhibition of portraits (in Kinokuniya Gallery at Shinjuku) of Simon Yotsuya, with nine other photographers.

Jumonji had started taking his "Untitled" series of portraits of people framed to exclude their heads in 1971. In 1972, these appeared in the magazine Camera Mainichi and were shown in the Neikrug gallery in New York; a year later they were included within "New Japanese Photography", at the New York MoMA.

Down till 1980, Jumonji made nineteen trips to Hawaiʻi, photographing the islands  and photographing and interviewing elderly first-generation Japanese immigrants. The series counterposes color photographs of Hawaiʻi and black-and-white portraits of the people living there. Installments were published in Camera Mainichi in 1979 and the set was exhibited in 1980, when it won the Ina Nobuo Award. It was published, as Orchid Boat, in 1981.

Jumonji's second published collection was Kéntauros, a large-format booklet of black-and-white photographs of the members of the motorbike organization Kéntauros (then a popular brand) striking macho poses with switchblades and other fashion accessories.

In 1981, Jumonji went to Indochina to photograph the religious customs of the Yao people. In 1983–4 he visited Thailand, Burma and Laos. The result was published as Sumitōtta yami in 1987.

Jumonji had started photographing gold works of art in 1981. The first exhibition of the results was in Matsuya department store (Ginza), in 1987. This work culminated in the large and lavishly produced book Ōgon fūtenjin, published in 1990. This won the Domon Ken Award the following year. Some of these works would also be shown in two of a set of four volumes of stereoscopes, all photographed by Jumonji and published in 1993–4.

Jumonji started photographing architecture and gardens in 1988, and specifically the Katsura Detached Palace in 1991.

Jumonji photographed Matsumoto Kōshirō IX for a collection of black-and-white portraits of the same title; in 2005 he published a second volume, Nippon Geki-gan, of monochrome portraits of actors taken with a large-format camera shortly before or after performance.

In 1998, Jumonji started work on Wabi, his ambitious attempt at a depiction (in color) of the Japanese aesthetic ideal of wabi. The project started with cha-no-yu but branched out into scenes of the quotidian.

Jumonji exhibited composite photographs of four Japanese waterfalls at the Shiseido Gallery (Ginza) in June and July 2004.

Jumonji's photographs have appeared in Zoom and Stern.

Bibliography

Books by Jumonji

Ran no fune / Orchid Boat. Tokyo: Tōjusha, 1981. ; .  The title alone is in English as well as Japanese.
Kéntauros. Tokyo: CBS Sony, 1984. .  
Sumitōtta yami (Darkness becoming visible). Tokyo: Shunjūsha, 1987. .  
Ōgon fūtenjin. Tokyo: Shōgakukan, 1990. .  Brief captions in English; all other text in Japanese only.
Katsura rikyū (Katsura Detached Palace). Nihon Mei-kenchiku shashin senshū 19. Tokyo: Shinchōsha, 1993. . With text by Teiji Itō (Itō Teiji) and Satoshi Yamato (Yamato Satoshi).  
Poketto butsuzō ( / A Pocketful of Buddhist Statues. 3D Stereo Museum. Tokyo: Shinchōsha, 1993. Vol. 1 . Vol 2 .  
Poketto ni ōgon ( / A Pocketful of Golden Treasures. 3D Stereo Museum. Tokyo: Shinchōsha, 1994. .  
Poketto ni Byōdō-in ( / A Pocketful of Uji Byodo-in Temple. 3D Stereo Museum. Tokyo: Shinchōsha, 1994. .  
Katsura rikyū (Katsura Detached Palace). Tonbo no hon. Tokyo: Shinchōsha, 1996. . With text by Machi Tawara.  
Jūmonji Bishin no shigoto to shūhen (The work and surroundings of Bishin Jumonji). Artist, Director and Designer Scan no. 10. Tokyo: Rikuyōsha, 2000. .  Samples of Jumonji's personal and advertising work, and particularly valuable for the latter. 
Wabi / Wabi. Kyoto: Tankōsha, 2002. .  Captions and text in both Japanese and English.
Koshiro Matsumoto. Purejidento, 2002. .  
Ochiru mizu ( / Water Falls. Tokyo: Shiseidō Kigyō Bunkabu, 2004. A set of cards in a box, for the exhibition held in June and July 2004. ; .  
Nippon gekigan / Nippon geki-gan: Dramatic portraits of actors and actresses. Tokyo: Pia, 2005. .  Captions and most text in English as well as Japanese.
Futatabi kage. Tokyo: Jūmonji Jimusho, 2006. .
Iru barusamiko / Il Balsamico. Tokyo: Kyūryūdō, 2007. .  Photographs of the Modena area and the production of balsamic vinegar.
Kansei no bakemono ni naritai / Beyond the Senses.  Tokyo: Kyuryudo Art Publishing, 2007. .  Over five hundred pages long, this is a chronological survey of Jumonji's work.
Murofushi Kōji: Kodoku na ōja. Tokyo: Bungei Shunju, 2010. .  Photographs of the hammer thrower Koji Murofushi.
Kenchiku o irodoru tekisutairu: Kawashima orimono no bi to waza  / Textiles for Architecture: The beauty and artistry of Kawashima textiles. Tokyo: Lixil, 2012. .
Aru mono. Tokyo: Jūmonji Jimusho, 2015.
Torikai. Two books, Kusatsugawa and Ginkō Torikai, in a box. Hitoyoshi, Kumamoto: Torikai Shuzō, 2016. Photographs by Jumonji; text by Kazunobu Torikai. About the shōchū maker Torikai Shuzō.
Tsunenaramu / Passing. Tokyo: Jūmonji Jimusho, 2017. .

Others
Matsuoka, Seigow  (Matsuoka Seigō). Yūkō no hakubutsugaku (Diverting museology). Tokyo: Shunjūsha, 1987. . Jumonji contributes a number of photographs for chapter 5, about gold works of art. 
Szarkowski, John, and Shoji Yamagishi. New Japanese Photography. New York: Museum of Modern Art, 1974.  (hard),  (paper). This includes a single photograph from the "Untitled" series.

Notes

External links
 Official site
Official site (English)
Water Falls the 2004 exhibition
 Sumitōtta yami This article by Seigow Matsuoka ranges further than the one book, and has sample photographs.

1947 births
Japanese photographers
Living people
People from Yokohama
Portrait photographers
Tokyo College of Photography alumni